This is a list of heritage-listed buildings in Rockhampton, Queensland, organised by suburb:

Allenstown 
Heritage-listed buildings in Allenstown:

 36 Larnach Street: St Marks Church
 Upper Dawson Road: South Rockhampton Cemetery
 170 William Street: St Josephs Cathedral

Berserker 
Heritage-listed buildings in Berserker:

 20 Bridge Street: North Rockhampton Borough Chambers
 278 Ford Street: St John's Church

Rockhampton City 
Heritage-listed buildings in Rockhampton City (the central business district):
 166 Alma Street: Shandon (residence)
 Archer Street: Training Depot Drill Hall Complex
 Bolsover Street: Block A, Rockhampton Technical College
 Bolsover Street: GS Curtis Stores (also known as AMV Warehouse)
 230 Bolsover Street: Rockhampton School of Arts
 201 Bolsover Street: Schotia Place
 232 Bolsover Street: Rockhampton Town Hall 
 280 Bolsover Street: St Andrew's Presbyterian Church
 Denison Street: Archer Park Railway Station
 233 Denison Street: Railway Administration Building
 42 East Street: Rockhampton Courthouse
 80 East Street: Rockhampton Post Office
 183 East Street: AMP Building
 187 East Street: John M Headrick & Co Building
 203 East Street: Walter Reid Community Arts Centre
 112-114 Kent Street: Rockhampton Masonic Hall
 150 Quay Street: Criterion Hotel
 162-164 Quay Street: Bulletin Building
 166 Quay Street: Rockhampton Club
 170 Quay Street: Trustee Chambers
 174 Quay Street: C J Edwards Chambers
 178 Quay Street: Rees R & Sydney Jones Building
 180 Quay Street: Cattle House
 182 Quay Street: Australian Estates Building
 186 Quay Street: Queensland National Bank
 194 Quay Street: Royal Bank of Queensland
 206 Quay Street: Archer Chambers
 208 Quay Street: Customs House
 230 Quay Street: Heritage Tavern
 232 - 234 Quay Street: Cahill's Stores
 236 Quay Street: ABC Radio Studios
 238 Quay Street: Goldsbrough Mort Building
 248 Quay Street: Avonleigh
 250 Quay Street: Clewett's Building
 260 Quay Street: Walter Reid Court
 288 Quay Street: Harbour Board Building
 89 William Street: St Paul's Anglican Cathedral
 89 William Street: St Paul's Cathedral Hall

Nerimbera 
Heritage-listed buildings in Nerimbera:

 St Christophers Chapel Road: St Christophers Chapel

Park Avenue 
Heritage-listed sites in Park Avenue:

 North Coast railway line over the Fitzroy River between Park Avenue and Wandal: Alexandra Railway Bridge

The Range 
Heritage-listed buildings in The Range:
 155 Agnes Street: Rockhampton Girls Grammar School
 248 Agnes Street: Rudd Residence
 263 Agnes Street: The Range Convent and High School
 Archer Street: Rockhampton Grammar School
 Canning Street: Medical superintendent's residence within the Rockhampton Base Hospital
 Canning Street: Therapies Building (incorporating Sister Elizabeth Kenny's Clinic) within the Rockhampton Base Hospital
 49 Jessie Street: Amla (house)
 30 Nathan Street: Wiseman's Cottage
 Penlington Street: Rockhampton War Memorial
 100 Spencer Street: Rockhampton Botanic Gardens
 25 Ward Street: Clancholla
 31 Ward Street: Kenmore House
 74 Ward Street: Yungaba Migrant Hostel
 86 Ward Street: Killowen, Rockhampton

Wandal 
Heritage-listed sites in Wandal:

 North Coast railway line over the Fitzroy River between Wandal and Park Avenue: Alexandra Railway Bridge

West Rockhampton 
Heritage-listed buildings in West Rockhampton:
 Canoona Road: St Aubins (house)

References

Buildings and structures in Rockhampton
Historical sites in Queensland
Rockhampton
Rockhampton
Rockhampton
Heritage listed buildings, Rockhampton
Rockhampton